The United States Marine Corps MOS 0306, infantry weapons officers, commonly referred to as "the gunner" or "Marine gunner" are non-technical chief warrant officers (CWO-2 to CWO-5) that are weapons specialists and are knowledgeable in the tactical employment of all the infantry weapons in the Marine Corps arsenal—all weapons organic to Marine infantry units.

Overview
The requirements to apply for selection are very stringent and much higher than what is needed for other warrant officer appointments.  For example; minimum time in service is sixteen years and minimum rank to apply is gunnery sergeant (E-7) versus eight years and sergeant (E-5). They are not appointed warrant officers, but rather commissioned directly to the grade of chief warrant officer-2 and are the only officers who are officially designated the title, "Marine gunner" and authorized to wear the "Bursting Bomb" insignia.

The title "gunner" is almost always used in lieu of rank (i.e., "Gunner Smith" as opposed to "Chief Warrant Officer Smith"), and the rank insignia worn on the left collar is replaced with a "Bursting Bomb." A larger "Bursting Bomb" insignia is worn ¾" above the rank insignia on both shoulder epaulets when a coat is worn. Occasionally other warrant officers are referred to as "gunner", but this is incorrect.

The gunners' technical skills complemented with infantry field experience fundamentally posits them as advisers to the force commanders within the Fleet Marine Force's task forces (i.e. Marine Expeditionary Force (MEF) and its subordinate units). Marine gunners may be responsible for developing and monitoring weapons training protocols, tactical employment of weapons, preventive maintenance of the unit's infantry weapons, management of the unit's ammunition allocation and the unit training plan, infantry training, and fire support planning. Additional assignments may be based on future needs of the Marine Corps; such as new weapons systems acquisition, new weapons systems research and development.

During combat operations, Marine gunners assists their force commanders in battle tracking; They are sent forward to oversee the battle, reporting directly to task force commanders in a "directed telescope" fashion.

Billet description and core competencies
The Marine Corps Infantry Training and Readiness Manual describes the gunner as follows:

The Gunner is a Chief Warrant Officer specifically trained in the employment and training of battalion organic weapons and assigned personnel. He is a special staff officer employed as the principal advisor to commanders at all levels to assist in the development of training plans and employment of organic weapons. During combat, the Gunner may be tasked to inspect fire plans to ensure organic fires are integrated and mutually supporting at the battalion level, perform other supervisory tasks at critical events, and/or command task organized or provisional combat units. Gunners are advisors on the MOS training requirements and development of all MOS 0321, 0313, and 0369 (Infantry SNCOS). They have oversight of the unit's ammunition allocation and annual weapons re-qualification programs. They accommodate all weapons organic to the MAGTF in accordance the current version of MCO 3570.1.

Additional duties will include: new weapons systems acquisition, new weapons systems research and development, foreign weapons training, curriculum development for infantry MOSs and Marine Corps Marksmanship Programs, and Fire Support Planning. The Gunner's strength is his ability to vet, conduct and quantify combined-arms training.

As infantry weapons officers advance in grade, billet assignments will include: Marine Gunner Plans, Policies & Operations Headquarters Marine Corps, Marine Gunner Infantry Training Battalion (SOI East or West), Marine Gunner Advanced Infantry Training Company (SOI East and West), Marine Gunner Marine Corps Ground Combat Operations Training Course, Tactical Training and Exercise Control Group (TTECG) MAGTF-TC, Marine Gunner Infantry Regiment (Active and Reserve) Marine Gunner Infantry Division (Active & Reserve Component), Marine Gunner Infantry Officer Course, Marine Gunner The Basic School, and Marine Gunner Small Arms Weapons Instructor School. Additional assignments may be assigned based on future needs of the Marine Corps.

History

Gunners were the first warrant officers in the Marine Corps when Henry Lewis Hulbert became the first marine to pin on the Bursting Bombs on 24 March 1917.  Since that time the gunner designation has undergone many changes, including periods where no new gunners were made from 1943 to 1956, 1959 to 1964, and 1974 to 1988.  These usually were the result of gunners being promoted to temporary commissioned officer status or changes in the laws governing the rank structure of the military.

Throughout this time, few marines have been able to rightly call themselves "gunner", but though the list is short, it is filled with legends of the Old Corps such as:

 Henry L. Hulbert; hero of Samoa, Belleau Wood, and Blanc Mont. A trophy bearing his name and image is presented to a Marine gunner for Outstanding Leadership every year by the commandant of the Marine Corps.
 Henry Pierson Crowe, who talked General Julian C. Smith out of putting him in for a Medal of Honor after the Battle of Tarawa (he received the Navy Cross instead).
William A. Lee, the first marine to receive three Navy Crosses but would spend World War II as a Japanese POW in China.
 Lee's father-in-law Maj. Calvin A. Lloyd, for whom the rifle ranges in Quantico are named; though Lloyd retired a major, he always answered the telephone as "Gunner Lloyd".

There are other less well known, but important gunners such as;

 Ira Davidson, the "Daniel Boone of Iwo Jima", who received a Navy Cross for taking out multiple Japanese pill boxes with uncanny accuracy while under withering fire.
 Gilbert Bolton, who was himself decorated for valor with a Silver Star in Vietnam for defending his platoon's position against a vastly larger NVA force by calling in six artillery missions on his own position and provided a link for the new breed of gunners to the past.
 Neil Goddard, who served in the USMC for 32 years. Gunner Goddard was a gunnery sergeant (E-7), a gunner, a CWO4, and a captain (O-3). Gunner Goddard spent time at Quantico developing rifles for the USMC during the Vietnam era. He is most famously known for his work in creating the M40A1 sniper rifle.

References

External links
 0306, Infantry Weapons Officer—www.mosdb.com

United States Marine Corps personnel
Military ranks of the United States Marine Corps
Warrant officers